Narail (pron: nɔɽail) is a district in south-western Bangladesh. It is a part of Khulna Division.

History
Narail town was named after a feudal lord (a zamindar). The zamindars established a market at Roopgonj, also named after a zamindar. They established a post office for the first time in the district during British Raj near Rotongonj, named after another member of the zamindar's family. They modernised Narail, and promoted culture, sports and education.

The large playing field, Kuriddobe, was a gift of the zamindar's family. They introduced football competition, with a shield given to the champions, a cup to the runners-up, and medals to all players from the early twentieth century.

One of the zamindars moved away from Narail, settled in Hatbaria, and established another large manor (Jomidarbaari).

Geography
It is located to the south of Magura District, north of Khulna District, with the Faridpur District and Gopalganj District on the east, and Jessore District to the west.

Through the district flow the Madhumati, Nabaganga, Bhairab, and Chitra rivers. There are many beels and haors, the most noted of which is Chachuri Beel.

Land area: 
Cultivable area: 
Fallow land: 
Forest area: 10 acres
Area irrigated: 
River area:

Religion

The district of Narail has 1675 mosques, 248 temples, 51 churches, seven tombs, and 11 shrines.

The Radha Raman Smriti Tirtha Mandir, founded by Shri Tribhanga Brahmachary (Babaji of Shri Shri Bhagvat Sevashram Sangh) at Debbhog is a prominent place to visit, as are Nishinath Tola in Rupganj and Lakkhipasha Thakurbari.

Administration
Narail District was established in 1984. It is divided into three upazilas: Narail Sadar Upazila, Kalia Upazila and Lohagara Upazila. The upazilas are divided into Narail Sadar and Kalia municipalities, and 39 Union Parishads. These are subdivided into 18 wards, 43 mahallas, 445 mouzas, and 651 villages.

Points of interest

Narail Victoria College and Collegiate School is one of the oldest modern high schools in Bangladesh, established in 1858 by the landlords of Narail who were proponents of education. They also established a girls' school, a rarity in Bangladesh at that time. This was the Shib Shankar Memorial Girls' School. This school closed down due to lack of funding after they left for India. It was reopened by some local enthusiasts, like J. Bhattacharjee, S. Biswas and B. Bhowmic. They borrowed furnishings from the neighbours. They went house to houses soliciting parents to send their children to the school.

Narail Palace was one of the biggest landlord mansions in Bengal. When the Hindu landlords left for Kolkata after the partition of India, the mansion was looted and vandalised, and gradually collapsed. There are still some remains present, including the Kaalibaari (temple of goddess Kali), Shibmondir (temple of Shiva) and the Bandha ghaat on the River Chitra. Some local people continued the famous Durga Puja in the mansion, but this was discontinued after a few years. Part of the building was used for some time as a government office. Due to lack of maintenance, it gave in.

Kalia Palace was another large landlord mansions in Bengal. Some landlords lived in Naragati. Naragati was a thana in the British period. The predecessor of Robi Sankar & Uday Sankar lived in Kalia.

The famous writer Bankim Chandra Chattopadhyay was a magistrate in Narail. His book Neelkuthi was based on the forceful cultivation of indigo in Narail by the East India Company.

Sheikh Mohammed Sultan (10 August 1923 – 10 October 1994; better known as SM Sultan, Bengali: এস এম সুলতান), was a Bengali avant-garde artist who worked in painting and drawing, was born in Narail District. His fame rests on his striking depictions of exaggeratedly muscular farmers engaged in the activities of their everyday lives.[1] He is the son of Sheikh Mohammed Mecher Ali & Mohammed Meherunnesa.

Narail was once declared independent from the British Raj by Shorola di (Sister Shorola), as she was known at the time by her followers of the independence movement of India. But this "independence" lasted for only three days.

Transport
The town of Narail is the road transport hub of the district. To the west it is connected by regional highway R750 to Jessore, about 32 km away. R720 runs north 50 km to Magura. Within the district, Zilla road Z7503 runs east to Lohagara and on to the Kalna ferry ghat on the Madhumati River. Z7502 runs south, across the Nabaganga River at Baroipara Ghat by ferry, and on to Kalia.

Demographics 

According to the 2011 Bangladesh census, Narail District had a population of 721,668, of which 353,527 were males and 368,141 females. Rural population was 609,316 (84.43%) and urban population was 112,352 (15.57%). Narail had a literacy rate of 61.27% for the population 7 years and above: 63.34% for males and 59.31% for females.

Muslims are 81.28% of the population while Hindus are 18.65% of the population. The population of Hindus has declined rapidly in the district since Partition, when the two communities were in equal numbers.

Notable residents

 Birshrestha Nur Mohammad Sheikh, Freedom Fighter of Bangladesh
 Major General Sheikh Mohammad Aman Hassan (retd), A two-star General in the Bangladesh Army, who notably served as the Directorate General (DG) of Special Security Force (SSF) from 2012 until his retirement in 2016 was born in Narail on 15 April 1960
 Mashrafe Bin Mortoza, former cricketer and captain of the Bangladesh national cricket team. popularly Known as "Narail Express". He was elected as Member of the Parliament 11th general election on 30 December 2019 as a Bangladesh Awami League candidate.
 Avishek Das (born 5 September 2001) is a Bangladeshi cricketer. He made his List A debut on 15 March 2020, for Old DOHS Sports Club, in the 2019–20 Dhaka Premier Division Cricket League. Prior to his List A debut, he was named in Bangladesh's squad for the 2020 Under-19 Cricket World Cup.
 Suvra Mukherjee, Former First Lady of India, wife of Former President of India Pranab Mukherjee
 Bijoy Sarkar, poet, baul singer, lyricist, and composer
 SM Sultan, Prominent artist
 Ravi Shankar, Great Sitar Master & organiser of The Concert for Bangladesh
 Md. Kabirul Haque, politician, businessman and Member of the Parliament 11th general election on 30 December 2019 as a Bangladesh Awami League candidate (Seats, Narail-1). 
 Shamoli Ray is a Bangladeshi competitive archer. At the 2016 Summer Olympics in Rio de Janeiro, she competed as a lone archer for the Bangladeshi team in the women's individual recurve through a tripartite invitation
 Jadunath Majumdar – Writer, Editor
 Nihar Ranjan Gupta – Bengali novelist 
 Kamal Dasgupta – Music director and eminent film composer 
 Syed Nausher Ali – Politician 
 Amal Sen – Politician
 Rathindranath Bose – Chemist
 Moslemuddin
 Nur Jalal
 Sheikh Abdus Salam – Martyred intellectual
 Abdul Jalil Shikder – Bir Protik
 Hemonto Sarkar
 Brigadier General (Retd) SK Abu Bakr, he is a Bangladesh Awami League politician and the former Member of Parliament of Narail-2.

See also
Districts of Bangladesh
Khulna Division

Notes

References

External links

 
Districts of Bangladesh